The Modena is a breed of fancy pigeon developed over many years of selective breeding. Modenas along with other varieties of domesticated pigeons are all descendants of the rock dove (Columba livia).

Description
The breed comes in many different colors in two main varieties, Gazzi and Schietti. Gazzi is a pied marking with the head and portion of the throat, the wings and the tail colored and the rest of the bird being white. Schiettis are non-pied.

Origin
The breed is of Italian origin and derives its name from the city of Modena where it was first bred centuries ago.

See also 
German Modena
List of pigeon breeds
National Modena Club

References

Pigeon breeds
Pigeon breeds originating in Italy